= Fravashi (film) =

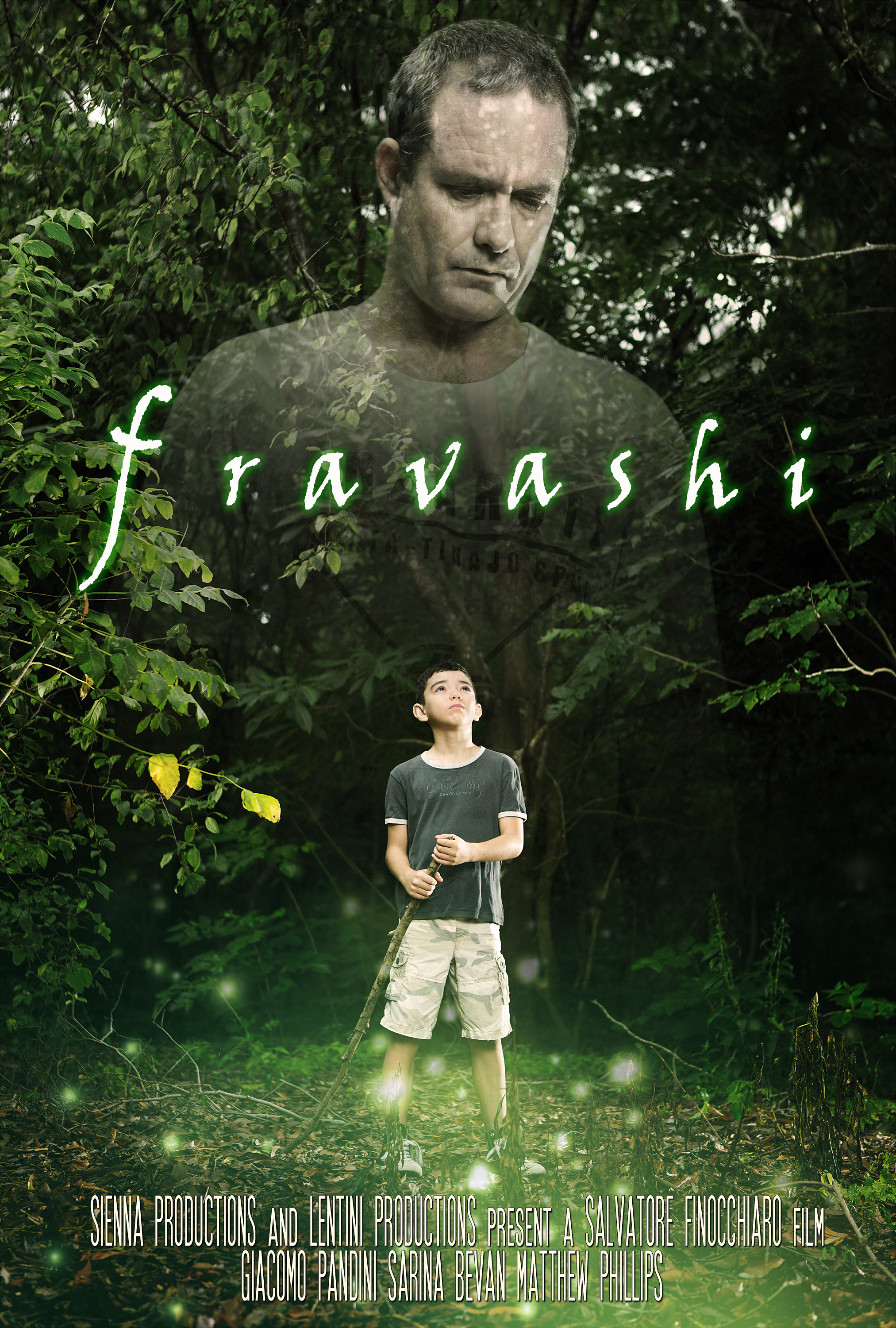
- Directed by: Salvatore Finocchiaro
- Written by: Salvatore Finocchiaro
- Starring: Giacomo Pandini and Sarina Bevan
- Release date: February 2014
- Running time: 13 minutes
- Country: Australia
- Language: English

Fravashi is a 2014 Australian independent short film, directed by Salvatore Finocchiaro and produced and filmed entirely in Darwin, Northern Territory.

== Cast ==
- Giacomo Pandini as Jack
- Sarina Bevan as Angel
- Matthew Phillips as Jack's Father
- Auki Henry as The Dark Angel
- Larry Owens as The Gatekeeper
- Vernon Lowe as the Bike Rider
- Ashlee McInnes as the Thief
- Maya De Luca as the Thief's Child
